The 2019 Calder Cup playoffs of the American Hockey League began on April 17, 2019 with the playoff format that was introduced in 2016. The sixteen teams that qualified, four from each division, play a best-of-five series in the division semifinals, with the playoffs continuing with best-of-seven series for the division finals, conference finals, and Calder Cup finals.

The playoffs ended with the Charlotte Checkers winning their first Calder Cup in franchise history, defeating the Chicago Wolves in five games in the Calder Cup Finals.

Playoff seeds
After the 2018–19 AHL regular season, 16 teams qualify for the playoffs. The top four teams in each division ranked by points qualify for the 2019 Calder Cup playoffs. The Charlotte Checkers were the first team to clinch a playoff spot on March 22 and won the regular season title with three games remaining.

Eastern Conference

Atlantic Division
 Charlotte Checkers – 110 points (.724)
 Bridgeport Sound Tigers – 95 points (.625)
 Hershey Bears – 94 points (.618)
 Providence Bruins – 87 points (.572)

North Division
 Syracuse Crunch – 102 points (.671)
 Rochester Americans – 99 points (.651)
 Toronto Marlies – 91 points (.599)
 Cleveland Monsters – 84 points (.553)

Western Conference

Central Division
 Chicago Wolves – 98 points (.645)
 Milwaukee Admirals – 88 points (.579)
 Iowa Wild – 87 points (.572), 33 
 Grand Rapids Griffins – 87 points (.572), 32

Pacific Division
 Bakersfield Condors – 89 points (.654)
 San Jose Barracuda – 85 points (.625)
 San Diego Gulls – 80 points (.588)
 Colorado Eagles – 77 points (.566)

Bracket

Division semifinals

Eastern Conference

(A1) Charlotte Checkers vs. (A4) Providence Bruins

(A2) Bridgeport Sound Tigers vs. (A3) Hershey Bears

(N1) Syracuse Crunch vs. (N4) Cleveland Monsters

(N2) Rochester Americans vs. (N3) Toronto Marlies

Western Conference

(C1) Chicago Wolves  vs. (C4) Grand Rapids Griffins

(C2) Milwaukee Admirals vs. (C3) Iowa Wild

(P1) Bakersfield Condors vs. (P4) Colorado Eagles

(P2) San Jose Barracuda vs. (P3) San Diego Gulls

Division finals

Eastern Conference

(A1) Charlotte Checkers vs. (A3) Hershey Bears

(N3) Toronto Marlies vs. (N4) Cleveland Monsters

Western Conference

(C1) Chicago Wolves vs. (C3) Iowa Wild

(P1) Bakersfield Condors vs. (P3) San Diego Gulls

Conference finals

Eastern Conference

(A1) Charlotte Checkers vs. (N3) Toronto Marlies

Western Conference

(C1) Chicago Wolves vs. (P3) San Diego Gulls

Calder Cup Finals

(A1) Charlotte Checkers vs. (C1) Chicago Wolves

Playoff statistical leaders

Leading skaters

These are the top ten skaters based on points. If there is a tie in points, goals take precedence over assists.

GP = Games played; G = Goals; A = Assists; Pts = Points; +/– = Plus-minus; PIM = Penalty minutes

Leading goaltenders 

This is a combined table of the top five goaltenders based on goals against average and the top five goaltenders based on save percentage with at least 240 minutes played. The table is initially sorted by goals against average, with the criterion for inclusion in bold.

GP = Games played; W = Wins; L = Losses; SA = Shots against; GA = Goals against; GAA = Goals against average; SV% = Save percentage; SO = Shutouts; TOI = Time on ice (in minutes)

References

External links
AHL official site

Calder Cup playoffs
Calder Cup Playoffs